Carli Anne Hollins (born July 16, 1982) is an American former professional soccer player. She is a two-time Olympic gold medalist (2008 and 2012), two-time FIFA Women's World Cup champion (2015 and 2019), two-time FIFA Player of the Year (2015 and 2016), and a four-time Olympian (2008, 2012, 2016 and 2021). Lloyd scored the gold medal-winning goals in the finals of the 2008 Summer Olympics and the 2012 Summer Olympics. Lloyd also helped the United States win their titles at the 2015 and 2019 FIFA Women's World Cups, the bronze medal at the 2020 Summer Olympics, and she played for the team at the 2011 FIFA Women's World Cup where the U.S. finished in second place. After the 2020 Summer Olympics, Lloyd announced she would be retiring from the national team following four final friendly matches in 2021. Lloyd has made 316 appearances for the U.S. national team, placing her second in caps, and has the fourth-most goals and fifth-most assists for the team. In March 2021, she was named as the highest paid female soccer player in the world. She played her last international match with the USWNT on October 26, 2021, shortly before retiring from professional soccer at the completion of the 2021 NJ/NY Gotham FC season.

During the United States' 5–2 win over Japan in the 2015 FIFA Women's World Cup Final, Lloyd became the first player ever to score three goals in a FIFA Women's World Cup final and the second soccer player ever to score a hat-trick in any senior FIFA World Cup Final, after Geoff Hurst. Lloyd scored three goals in the first 16 minutes of the final, with the first two occurring in the first five minutes of the game and within three minutes of each other. She received the Golden Ball Trophy as the best player of the tournament and earned the Silver Boot for her six goals and one assist during the tournament.

She previously played for the Chicago Red Stars, Sky Blue FC (now known as NJ/NY Gotham FC), and Atlanta Beat in Women's Professional Soccer (WPS). In 2013, she was allocated to the Western New York Flash for the inaugural season of the NWSL and helped her team win the regular season championship. After two seasons with the Flash, she was traded to Houston Dash prior to the 2015 season and then to Sky Blue before the 2018 season. Her memoir, When Nobody Was Watching, was published in September 2016.

Early life
Born to Stephen and Pamela Lloyd, Carli was raised in Delran Township, a suburban community located in South Jersey about 20 minutes northeast of Philadelphia. Lloyd began playing soccer at age five. Of her exposure to soccer at a young age, Lloyd's mother, Pamela said, "At that age, it was coed, and Carli was hanging with the boys. She always loved it and showed a lot of ability from an early age, but she also has always worked hard." Lloyd has a brother, Stephen, and a sister, Ashley. Lloyd attended the opening U.S. match of the 1999 FIFA Women's World Cup, which inspired her to play for the national team.

Lloyd attended Delran High School from 1997 to 2000 where she played soccer under the tutelage of the late Rudy "The Red Baron" Klobach. As a high school athlete, she was known for her exceptional ball control and skill at distributing the ball from the midfield. During her senior year, she scored 26 goals and served eight assists while captaining her team to an 18–3 record. The Philadelphia Inquirer twice-named her Girls' High School Player of the Year in 1999 and 2000. She was named to the Star-Ledger All-State First Team twice and received 1999 and 2000 Parade All-American honors. In 2000, she was named the Courier-Post Player of the Year and the South Jersey Soccer Coaches Association (SJSCA) Midfielder of the Year.

Rutgers Scarlet Knights, 2001–2004
Lloyd attended Rutgers University from 2001 to 2004 and played for the Scarlet Knights women's soccer team under head coach Glenn Crooks. She was named First-Team All-Big East for four straight years – the first athlete at Rutgers to do so. She ended her collegiate career as the school's all-time leader in points (117), goals (50), and shots.

During her freshman season, Lloyd started every match and was the team's leading scorer with 15 goals for a total of 37 points. She was named to Soccer America's All-Freshman Team and was the first Rutgers player to earn Big East Rookie of the Year honors. As a sophomore, she was the team's leading scorer for the second consecutive season with 12 goals and seven assists for 31 points. The same year Lloyd was a finalist for the Hermann Trophy, widely considered the highest accolade for collegiate soccer players. During her third season with the Scarlet Knights, she scored 13 goals and served 2 assists for a total of 28 points and was named a Big East Academic All-Star. As a senior, she was a starter for 18 of the 20 games she played, scored 10 goals and served one assist. Lloyd was named the 2004 Big East Midfielder of the Year. She earned a bachelor's degree from Rutgers University in Exercise Science and Sport Studies.

In 2013, Lloyd was inducted into the Rutgers Hall of Distinguished Alumni.

Club career

W-League Experience (1999–2004)
While still in high school, Lloyd played for W-League teams Central Jersey Splash in 1999, New Brunswick Power in 2000, and South Jersey Banshees in 2001. In the summer prior to her senior year at Rutgers, Lloyd played for the New Jersey Wildcats in 2004 with teammates Kelly Smith, Manya Makoski, Tobin Heath, and Heather O'Reilly. She made only one appearance for the club.

The WPS Years (2009–2011)
With the return of a top-flight women's professional soccer league to the United States via Women's Professional Soccer, Lloyd's playing rights were allocated to the Chicago Red Stars in 2008. During the league's inaugural season, she started in 14 of her 16 appearances for Chicago playing a total of 1,313 minutes on the pitch. She scored two goals: one in the 23rd minute of her team's 4–0 win over the Boston Breakers on April 25; and the other during the 24th minute of a 3–1 defeat of the Los Angeles Sol on August 2. The Red Stars finished sixth on the season with a  record.

Following the conclusion of the season, Lloyd was declared a free agent and subsequently signed with her home state club and 2009 WPS champions, Sky Blue FC, for the 2010 season. In April 2010, during a match against her former team, Chicago Red Stars, Lloyd slipped and broke her ankle. The injury kept her off the pitch for most of the season although she did return for two games in September.

In December 2010, Lloyd signed with expansion team Atlanta Beat for the 2011 season. Of her signing, Beat head coach James Galanis said, "She is a fantastic midfielder and someone who is fully focused on the game. I have known her from her college days, and I have had the opportunity to train her and improve her game individually. She has made a lot of sacrifices off the field to reach her dreams, and she is going to bring a lot of professionalism to the team." Lloyd scored two goals in her ten appearances for the Beat. She scored the team's lone goal in a 4–1 defeat by the Boston Breakers on April 9. Her second goal on the season was an equalizer during the 70th minute of a 2–2 draw against the Western New York Flash. The Beat finished their first season in last place with a  record.

Western New York Flash (2013–2014)
On January 11, 2013, Lloyd joined the Western New York Flash in the new National Women's Soccer League as part of the NWSL Player Allocation. After recovering from a shoulder injury suffered earlier in the year, Lloyd made her debut for the Flash on May 12, 2013, during the team's 2–1 defeat of FC Kansas City. She scored her first goal in a match against her former club, Sky Blue FC, helping the Flash win 3–0. During a match against the Washington Spirit on June 28, Lloyd scored a hat trick leading the Flash to a 4–0 win. She was subsequently named NWSL Player of the Week for her performance.

Lloyd finished the 2013 season with 10 goals, the third most goals scored on the season. The Flash finished first during the regular season with a  record and advanced to the playoffs. During the Flash's semi-final match against Sky Blue FC, Lloyd scored both of the Flash's game-winning goals: one in the 33rd minute and the second coming during stoppage time. Her two goals resulted in a 2–0 win that advanced the Flash to the championship final against the Portland Thorns FC. The Flash were defeated 2–0 during the final.

Houston Dash (2015–2017)

On October 16, 2014, Lloyd was traded to the Houston Dash in exchange for Becky Edwards, Whitney Engen and a third-round pick in the 2016 NWSL College Draft.

Manchester City (2017 loan)

In February 2017, Lloyd joined Manchester City on loan, for the FA WSL Spring Series. While Lloyd was at Manchester City, they finished second in the WSL Spring Series, and won the 2016–17 FA Women's Cup, with her scoring in the final. Lloyd's final appearance for City came on May 21, when she was sent off for elbowing Yeovil Town's Annie Heatherson in the face. The three match ban she received for violent conduct ran for the remainder of her loan stay.

Sky Blue / NJ/NY Gotham (2018–2021)
On January 18, 2018, Lloyd was traded to Sky Blue FC (later known as NJ/NY Gotham FC) along with Janine Beckie by the Dash in a three-team trade with the Chicago Red Stars and Sky Blue FC. Lloyd scored 4 goals in 18 appearances for Sky Blue in 2018. She scored the only goal in a 1–0 win over the Orlando Pride on the last day of the 2018 NWSL season. It was Sky Blue's first and only win of the season. She was named to the 2018 NWSL Second XI.

International career

Youth national team
Lloyd represented the United States at the under-21 level before making the jump to the senior team at the age of 23. As a member of the under-21 team, she played at the Nordic Cup four times winning consecutive titles from 2002 to 2005 in Finland, Denmark, Iceland, and Sweden respectively. During the first round of the 2003 Nordic Cup, she served the assist in the U.S.' 1–0 win against Denmark. At the 2004 Nordic Cup, she scored two goals and served one assist while starting in every match. The following year at the 2005 Nordic Cup, she scored three times including one goal during the championship match against Norway.

Senior national team

Lloyd made her first appearance for the United States women's national soccer team on July 10, 2005, against Ukraine. She scored her first international goal on October 1, 2006, against Taiwan. At the 2006 Four Nations Tournament, Lloyd won a third cap. Her first two starts of her international career came at the 2006 Algarve Cup, starting the group game against Denmark and in the final against Germany. She played in 19 games, starting 13, and scored one goal.

2007 FIFA Women's World Cup
After scoring once in her first 24 matches with the national team, Lloyd scored four goals at the 2007 Algarve Cup. As the tournament's top scorer, she was awarded Most Valuable Player tournament honors. Lloyd logged her first brace for the national team during a 6–1 win against New Zealand.

The same year, Lloyd played in her first FIFA Women's World Cup tournament. Heading into the tournament, the national team had not lost a game in regulation time in nearly three years and was considered a favorite to win the tournament in China. During their first match of the tournament, the U.S. tied North Korea 2–2. The team faced Sweden in their next match on September 14 and won 2–0 with two goals from Abby Wambach. The U.S. finished group play with a 1–0 win over Nigeria women's national football team on September 18.

During the quarterfinal match against England on September 22, the U.S. won 3–0. All three goals were scored within 12 minutes. The U.S. faced Brazil in the semi-final in what would become a controversial and game-changing match for the team. Coach Greg Ryan decided to bench starting goalkeeper, Hope Solo, and instead started Brianna Scurry, a veteran goalkeeper who had started in three World Cups and two Olympics, but who had started very few matches since the 2004 Olympics. The U.S. was defeated 4–0 by Brazil. The loss relegated them to a final match against Norway, which they won 4–1, to secure third place standing at the tournament. Lloyd started three of the five games in which she played at the tournament.

Throughout 2007, Lloyd started 13 of the 23 matches in which she played. She ranked third on the team in scoring with nine goals and three assists.

2008 Beijing Olympics
During the championship match of the CONCACAF Women's Olympic Qualifying Tournament, Lloyd scored the U.S.' only goal during stoppage time on a free-kick. The U.S. eventually defeated Canada 6–5 in penalty kicks. She scored two goals during the 2008 Olympics: the game-winning goal in the team's 1–0 defeat of Japan during the tournament's group stage and another game-winning goal in extra time against Brazil during the final helping the U.S. win gold.

Lloyd was named the 2008 U.S. Soccer Athlete of the Year along with Tim Howard. She was on the starting lineup in all 35 games in which she played in 2008, tying for the team lead in matches started during the year. Her 2,781 minutes on the pitch for the U.S. ranked third on the team in minutes played. Her nine goals and nine assists resulted in her best scoring year yet on the national team.

Injury recovery, 100th cap and World Cup qualifying, 2009–2010
In 2009, the U.S. national team competed in eight games, of which Lloyd was on the starting lineup in five. At the 2010 Algarve Cup, Lloyd scored the game-opening goal in the final helping the U.S. clinch the championship title after defeating Germany 3–2.

Although she suffered a broken ankle in the fourth game of the 2010 WPS Season while playing for Sky Blue FC, she played in 15 matches for the United States in 2010, starting 14. Lloyd started all five games at the 2010 CONCACAF Women's World Cup Qualifying Tournament, scoring two goals, including the United States' lone goal during the championship match. She ended the tournament with five assists and was named the Player of the Match three times during the tournament. After the U.S. finished third at the tournament, they traveled to Italy to vie for a place at the 2011 FIFA Women's World Cup in the UEFA-CONCACAF play-off against Italy. Playing every minute of the series, Lloyd scored three goals with five assists during the series. She earned her 100th career cap during the second leg of the series.

2011 FIFA Women's World Cup

2011 saw the U.S. team making preparations for the 2011 FIFA Women's World Cup and training starting with the Four Nations Tournament. Lloyd scored the lone goal for the U.S. in the opening match loss to Sweden. In the championship match, the U.S. defeated Canada 2–0 with Lloyd scoring the first goal and being named Player of the Match.

At the 2011 Algarve Cup, Lloyd scored three goals including the first goal in the championship match; subsequently named best goal for the tournament. She was named player of the match for the 2nd time in the tournament. The team won the cup, making it their eighth title win.

At the 2011 FIFA Women's World Cup, Lloyd scored the final goal in a 3–0 win against Colombia for her first World Cup goal. Throughout the tournament, she tallied an assist, a goal, and one successful penalty kick in the shootout against Brazil to send the U.S. to the semi-finals vs. France. In the World Cup final, after finishing the game tied 2–2 the U.S. went on to penalty kicks with Japan. Along with two teammates who failed to convert their penalty kicks, Lloyd mishit the ball over the crossbar. The U.S. won the silver medal at the tournament.

2012 London Olympics

The national team opened 2012 with the Olympic Qualifiers in Vancouver, British Columbia, Canada. The U.S. was placed in Group B with the Dominican Republic, Guatemala, and Mexico. In the first match, the United States routed the Dominican Republic by a score of 14–0 with Lloyd tallying one goal and one assist. In the second match, the U.S. again defeated Guatemala 13–0 with Lloyd again finding the back of the net and providing an assist.

The game to win the group and thus play the second place team from Group A occurred between the U.S. and Mexico. The U.S. was previously defeated 2–1 by Mexico during the 2010 CONCACAF Women's Gold Cup. This time, the U.S. beat Mexico 4–0 with Lloyd netting her first career hat trick. She was subsequently named player of the match.

In the semi-final, the U.S. faced Costa Rica. During the second half, the U.S. scored two goals, the second coming from Lloyd. The U.S. beat Costa Rica 3–0 with Lloyd named player of the match for the second game in a row. During the final match against Canada, the U.S. defeated Canada at home 4–0 to move on to the Olympics as the CONCACAF champions. Lloyd finished the tournament with six goals and three assists and tied for the team lead in goals scored.

At the 2012 Summer Olympics in London, Lloyd scored the go-ahead goal in the 56th minute of the team's opening match against France, to boost the U.S. to a 3–2 lead; the match ended with a final score of 4–2. She scored her second goal of the tournament against Colombia during the group stage.

During the Olympic gold medal match against Japan, played at London's Wembley Stadium, Lloyd scored both American goals in the team's 2–1 victory. Her four goals in the tournament tied for the second highest on the U.S. squad. She is the only player (of either gender) in history to score the game-winning goal in two separate Olympic gold medal matches; her first occurred during the Beijing 2008 final against Brazil.

After scoring her 46th international goal in the 13th minute of a friendly against New Zealand in October 2013, Lloyd became the highest-scoring midfielder in the team's history, passing Julie Foudy, who finished her career with 45 goals.

2015 FIFA Women's World Cup
In April 2015, Lloyd was named by head coach Jill Ellis to the 23-player roster for the 2015 FIFA Women's World Cup in Canada. Lloyd captained the team during four of the team's matches, including the quarterfinal against China, in which she scored the winning goal on her 200th cap, semi-final against Germany and final against Japan, and scored six goals during the tournament, finishing the tournament on a four-game goalscoring streak that spanned the knockout stage and that culminated in a hat trick in the game's opening 16 minutes during the final against Japan. The last goal was hailed by Reuters as "one of the most remarkable goals ever witnessed in a Women's World Cup", and featured Lloyd catching Japanese goalkeeper Ayumi Kaihori off her line and chipping her virtually from the halfway line.

For her efforts in leading the United States to a record third World Cup title, and first since 1999, she won the Golden Ball as the best player of the tournament. While Lloyd's six goals were enough to match Celia Sasic as the tournament's top scorer, Sasic won the Golden Boot for playing fewer minutes and Lloyd was awarded the Silver Boot. Lloyd also became the first woman to score a hat trick in a World Cup final and the first player, male or female, to do so since Geoff Hurst did so for England against West Germany at Wembley in 1966. Only one player has since replicated the feat – Kylian Mbappé for France against Argentina in Lusail, Qatar in 2022. Furthermore, her third goal earned her a nomination for the Puskás Award, FIFA's annual award for Goal of the Year. Finally, Lloyd is the only player to have scored a hat trick in normal time of a World Cup final; Hurst scored two goals in extra time and Mbappé one.

2019 FIFA Women's World Cup
Lloyd scored in her first two games of the 2019 FIFA Women's World Cup; one against Thailand and two against Chile. Hence, she became the first player to score in six straight Women's World Cup matches.

Reaching her 300th cap, 2019–2021
On April 10, 2021, Lloyd earned her 300th cap in a friendly match against Sweden to become the third player to achieve that feat after Kristine Lilly and Christie Pearce. On June 14, 2021, she became the oldest player at 38 years and 332 days to score for the United States in a 4–0 win over Jamaica at the BBVA Stadium, and thereby beating the record previously held by Kristine Lilly (38 years, 264 days).

2020 Tokyo Olympics and retirement
On August 5, 2021, she scored twice in a 4–3 win over Australia in the bronze medal match of the 2020 Summer Olympics, to set the U.S. women's record for most Olympic goals, 10 goals in total, surpassing Abby Wambach. Following the Olympics, Lloyd announced she would be retiring from the national team in 2021.

In early 2022, she partnered with Teqball USA and one of her retirement plans is to make Teqball an Olympic sport by 2028. She also developed CL10 Soccer Clinic, a program  to help people improve their soccer skills. In October 2022, she co-conducted the draw for the 2023 Women's World Cup in Australia and New Zealand held at the Aotea Centre in Auckland.

Career statistics

International goals

Goals by opponent

Honors
 Manchester City
 FA Women's Cup: 2016–17

United States
Algarve Cup: 2007, 2008, 2010, 2011, 2013, 2015
CONCACAF Women's Championship: 2014, 2018
 CONCACAF Women's Olympic Qualifying Tournament: 2008, 2012, 2016; 2020
 Olympic Gold Medal: 2008, 2012
 Olympic Bronze Medal: 2021
 FIFA Women's World Cup: 2015, 2019Runner-up: 2011
 SheBelieves Cup: 2016; 2018; 2020; 2021
Tournament of Nations: 2018

Individual
 Algarve Cup Most Valuable Player: 2007
 U.S. Soccer Athlete of the Year: 2008
 FIFA World Player of the Year Shortlist: 2012, 2015, 2016
 FIFA Puskás Award Nominee: 2015
 NWSL Player of the Week: July 2013, July 2014
 NWSL Player of the Month: July 2015
NWSL Second XI: 2014, 2015, 2018
 CONCACAF Women's Player of the Year: 2015
 CONCACAF Goal of the Year: 2015
 FIFA Women's World Cup Golden Ball: 2015
 FIFA Women's World Cup Silver Boot: 2015
 FIFA Women's World Cup All-Star Team: 2015
 FIFA Women's World Cup Dream Team: 2015
 FIFA Women's World Cup Goal of the Tournament: 2015
 Women's Sports Foundation Sportswoman of the Year Team Sport Award: 2015
 IFFHS World's Best Woman Playmaker: 2015
 FIFA World Player of the Year: 2015
 FIFPro: FIFA FIFPro World XI 2015, 2016, 2021
 The Best FIFA Women's Player: 2016
 Inductee into New Jersey Hall of Fame: 2017
 IFFHS CONCACAF Best Woman Player of the Decade 2011–2020
 IFFHS World's Woman Team of the Decade 2011–2020
 IFFHS CONCACAF Woman Team of the Decade 2011–2020

Style of play
Although she was criticised for being inconsistent at the beginning of career, and for losing possession too easily, Lloyd later developed into one of the best players in the world, and is highly regarded for her outstanding determination, mental strength, and work-ethic. A tenacious, energetic, and hard-working player, she also is known for her control, technique, and passing accuracy, and is capable of aiding her team both defensively and offensively, due to her stamina, strength, and tackling, as well as her ability to get into good attacking positions, and either score goals or create chances for teammates. These abilities, coupled with her tactical versatility, enabled her to be deployed in several midfield positions; although she began her career in the centre, as a defensive midfielder, she was most comfortable when moved to a more advanced role, as an attacking midfielder behind the forwards. Lloyd earned a reputation as a "clutch player", due to her tendency to score decisive goals. A powerful striker of the ball, she was capable of scoring from any position on the pitch, and could finish well both with her head and with her feet inside the area.

Personal life
Lloyd lives with her husband, golfer Brian Hollins, in Mount Laurel, New Jersey. They married on November 4, 2016, in Puerto Morelos, Mexico.

In popular culture

Endorsements
Lloyd has had an endorsement deal with Nike for several years. In 2011, she was the focus of a promotional feature for the sports company entitled, Pressure Makes Us: Carli Lloyd. Following the 2015 FIFA Women's World Cup, Lloyd starred in a commercial for Xfinity and signed an endorsement deal with Visa. In August 2015, she co-starred in a Nike commercial called Snow Day also featuring Rob Gronkowski and teammate Sydney Leroux. In April 2016, she was named brand ambassador for Lifeway Foods and appeared in a television commercial for Heineken the same year. She has a partnership with Whole Foods Market and appeared in a television commercial for United Airlines. In June 2016, she joined Michael Phelps in partnership deals with Krave Jerky. She also has endorsement deals with Beats by Dre, Kind, and NJM Insurance.

Magazines, television, and video games
Lloyd has been featured in Glamour, Shape, and Sports Illustrated magazines. She was on the covers of Howler Magazine and Sports Illustrated. In 2012, she appeared in an ESPN feature called Title IX is Mine: USWNT. Lloyd has made appearances on numerous television shows including: Good Morning America, The Daily Show with Jon Stewart, Live with Kelly and Michael, The Today Show, Late Night with Seth Meyers, Fox and Friends, Late Late Show with James Corden.

Lloyd was featured along with her national teammates in the EA Sports' FIFA video game series in FIFA 16, the first time women players were included in the game. In September 2015, she was ranked by EA Sports as the No. 1 women's player in the game.

Ticker tape parade and White House honor
Following the United States' win at the 2015 FIFA Women's World Cup, Lloyd and her teammates became the first women's sports team to be honored with a ticker tape parade in New York City. Each player received a key to the city from Mayor Bill de Blasio. In October of the same year, the team was honored by President Barack Obama at the White House.

See also 

 List of multiple Olympic gold medalists in one event
 List of Olympic medalists in football
 List of women's footballers with 100 or more caps
 List of FIFA Women's World Cup hat-tricks
 List of Rutgers University alumni

References

Match reports

Further reading
 Grainey, Timothy (2012), Beyond Bend It Like Beckham: The Global Phenomenon of Women's Soccer, University of Nebraska Press, 
 Lisi, Clemente A. (2010), The U.S. Women's Soccer Team: An American Success Story, Scarecrow Press, 
 
 Solo, Hope (2012), Solo: A Memoir of Hope, Harper & Collins, 
 Stevens, Dakota (2011), A Look at the Women's Professional Soccer Including the Soccer Associations, Teams, Players, Awards, and More, BiblioBazaar,

External links

 
 
 
 
 
 
 
 Carli Lloyd at Houston Dash
 
 
 
 
 

1982 births
Living people
Delran High School alumni
People from Delran Township, New Jersey
People from Mount Laurel, New Jersey
Sportspeople from Burlington County, New Jersey
American women's soccer players
American expatriate sportspeople in England
United States women's international soccer players
Rutgers Scarlet Knights women's soccer players
Footballers at the 2008 Summer Olympics
Footballers at the 2012 Summer Olympics
Footballers at the 2016 Summer Olympics
Footballers at the 2020 Summer Olympics
Olympic gold medalists for the United States in soccer
Chicago Red Stars players
Atlanta Beat (WPS) players
Manchester City W.F.C. players
New Jersey Wildcats players
Houston Dash players
NJ/NY Gotham FC owners
NJ/NY Gotham FC players
FIFA Century Club
2007 FIFA Women's World Cup players
2011 FIFA Women's World Cup players
2015 FIFA Women's World Cup players
Soccer players from New Jersey
USL W-League (1995–2015) players
National Women's Soccer League players
Western New York Flash players
Women's Super League players
Medalists at the 2008 Summer Olympics
Medalists at the 2012 Summer Olympics
FIFA Women's World Cup-winning players
Women's association football midfielders
FIFA World Player of the Year winners
FIFA Women's World Cup-winning captains
2019 FIFA Women's World Cup players
American expatriate sportspeople in Canada
American expatriate women's soccer players
Expatriate women's soccer players in Canada
Expatriate women's footballers in England
Olympic bronze medalists for the United States in soccer
Medalists at the 2020 Summer Olympics
Women's Professional Soccer players